K. G. Jayan (born 21 November 1934) is an Indian Carnatic musician, who was awarded the Padma Shri, the fourth highest civilian award in India in 2019. He is known for devotional songs. Jayan has composed more than 1,000 songs and also has been music director for a few Tamil and Malayalam films. The popular actor Manoj K. Jayan is his younger son.

Jayan and his twin brother K. G. Vijayan, with whom he formed the famous Jaya-Vijaya team, were born as the third and fourth sons of late Gopalan Thanthrikal and late Narayani Amma on 21 November 1934 at their home in Kottayam. They started to learn Carnatic music at a very young age, and had their arangettam at Kumaranalloor Devi Temple at the age of nine. Their first guru was one Raman Bhagavathar, and then they learnt from Mavelikkara Radhakrishna Iyer. They underwent Ganabhooshanam course at the famous Swathi Thirunal College of Music at Thiruvananthapuram after their schooling, and passed with distinction. Later, they had their advanced training from Carnatic giants like Alathur Brothers, Chembai Vaidyanatha Bhagavathar and M. Balamuralikrishna. It was during their lessons under Chembai that they started composing and singing songs.

Awards and recognition
 1991 – Kerala Sangeetha Nataka Akademi Award – Government of Kerala
 2013 – Harivarasanam Award – Government of Kerala and Travancore Devaswom Board
 2019 – Padma Shri – Government of India

See also 

 List of Padma Shri award recipients (2010–2019)

References 

Male Carnatic singers
Carnatic singers
Recipients of the Padma Shri in arts
Living people
1934 births
Recipients of the Kerala Sangeetha Nataka Akademi Award